The Ziggo Dome ( or ) is an indoor arena in Amsterdam, Netherlands, located next to the Johan Cruijff ArenA. It is named after the Dutch cable TV provider Ziggo. In 2014, the Ziggo Dome Awards were announced, recognizing artists who performed at the arena.

Architecture

The Ziggo Dome was designed by Benthem Crouwel Architects. Although the name 'Dome' refers to a dome, there are no round shapes. The building has the shape of a square block; the size is 90 by 90 meters, with a height of 30 meters. On the outside, the Ziggo Dome, on a black background, is fully lined with a total of 840,000 LEDs, where video images can be displayed.

The building is designed for amplified music, but is multi-usable and can also be made suitable for tennis and korfball competitions, an Olympic-size swimming pool or an ice rink with minimal adjustments.

Notable events 
The Ziggo Dome has been heavily used for concerts; as of 2017, it ranks behind Madison Square Garden, SSE Hydro, Manchester Arena, and the O2 Arena London as the 5th busiest concert venue in the world.

From 2016, the final of the Korfbal League, the highest Korfball league in the Netherlands, will take place in the Ziggo Dome until 2019. This was announced by the Dutch governing body of korfball KNKV in July 2015. Previously, the event was held for over 30 years in Rotterdam Ahoy.

On 18 May 2018, and 12 November 2019, American professional wrestling promotion WWE held two house shows at the Ziggo Dome, of which the first being a SmackDown Live house show.

The Ziggo Dome were one of the two venues that were part of the 2022 UEFA Futsal Championship where Group Stage and Knockout Futsal matches took place between 19 January to 6 February 2022.

Concerts

See also 
 List of indoor arenas in the Netherlands

Notes and references

Notes

References

External links 

Venue information

Music venues completed in 2012
Sports venues completed in 2012
Indoor arenas in the Netherlands
Indoor ice hockey venues in the Netherlands
Sports venues in Amsterdam
Concert halls in Amsterdam
Amsterdam-Zuidoost